All at Sea is a 1977 Australian television film about a group of misfits on holiday on an island resort. It used the cast from The Celebrity Game.

Premise
The adventures of various guests and staff at Sea Island Resort in Queensland. It is run by Mr Blimer with the help of John Bright.  Blimer tries to seduce his assistant; a waitress, Joy, is constantly harassed by the guests but is working her own agenda; employee Mike likes Maryanne but winds up sleeping with the seemingly proper Miss Farrow; Arthur Pickering, is a government minister; a reverend, Parslow, is actually a thief.

Cast
Johnny Pace as John Bright
Mike Preston as Mike
Joe Martin as Joe, the barman
Joy Chambers as Joy 
Harriet Pace (as "Harriet") as Miss Tuttle
Noel Ferrier as Mr. Blimer
Johnny Lockwood as Reverend Parslow/George Parsons
Abigail as Denise Demour
Stuart Wagstaff as Mr Arthur Pickering
Cornelia Frances as Miss Farrow
Sheila Kennelly as Mrs. Hand
Ugly Dave Gray as Dick Goscomb
Barry Creyton as Dennis Radley
Megan Williams as Maryanne Hand
Barbara Wyndon
Jacqueline Kott
Garry Keane
Sheryl Sciro
Ray Marshall
Alan Penney

Production
The film was a rare comedy from the Grundy Organisation. Reg Grundy claimed he was the one who had the idea of making an Australian TV movie in the vein of the Carry On films featuring the most popular comics in the country. He pitched the idea to Ian Holmes at Channel Ten who agreed to finance it. Grundy's wife Joy Chambers was then a panelist on The Celebrity Game on Channel Ten, and she also appeared in the cast.

Grundy assigned producing duties to Howard Leeds who had recently joined Grundys from Hollywood. "So here I had an American producing a show that was based entirely on English comedy with mostly Australian actors", Grundy later wrote. "It was a mishmash."

The Johnny Lockwood part was originally offered to John Meillon who turned it down.

The film was shot in Sydney over 12 days in February 1977 at locations including the Shore Motel at Artarmon, the Pasadena Hotel, Church Point, Sacha's Restaurant, the Newport Hotel and Newport.

Noel Ferrier called it "a nightmarish experience" because the film featured so many stand-up comics. "Being in a company of, or working with, one stand up comedian can be a taxing experienced; when surrounded by about eight of this remarkable breed the consequences can be singularly unfunny. There were more tantrums and bitchy scenes among this bunch of lovelies than you'd be likely to find in half a dozen ballet companies."

Reception
Grundy wrote in his 2010 memoirs that the movie "got a twenty-one rating which these days would be a hit but back then was just okay. Howard [Leeds] had struck out." No TV station wanted to pick it up and turn it into a series.

References

External links
 
 All at Sea at Ozmovies
 All at Sea at AustLit

Australian comedy television films
1977 television films
1977 films
Films directed by Igor Auzins
1970s English-language films